Boltz Lake, located in Grant County, Kentucky, is a  reservoir.

References

Protected areas of Grant County, Kentucky
Reservoirs in Kentucky
Bodies of water of Grant County, Kentucky